Budhathoki is a surname of the tagadhari Chhetri group of the Khas community of Nepal. People with the Budhathoki surname reside mostly in Nepal and India. Notable people with this surname include:

Karn Jit Budhathoki, Nepalese Parliament member
Keshav Kumar Budhathoki, Nepalese legislative member
Prakash Budhathoki, Nepalese footballer

बुढा क्षेत्री  नेपाल म बस्ने तागा धारी खस आर्य हुन्  मुख्य बसोबास दैलेख सुर्खेत जाजरकोट कालिकोट सल्यान गुल्मी  काठमाडौं दाङ झापा लगायत देश भरी का       बि भिन्न ठाँउ मा बसोबास गर्छन् 

 सान्डिल्य गोत्र भयका दैलेख जोरेबाझ बसोबास गर्ने बुढा क्षेत्री हरु भारत को श्रीमोर बाट आयका आर्य राजपुत ठकुरी हुन्  यिनिहरुको कुल देवता ‍‍‌ग्वाला हुन्  यिनिहरु अन्य देवता मस्टो पनि मान्दछन त्यस् ठाँउ मा उनीहरुलाई  जिमदार अथवा जिम्माल भन्छन् 

Nepali-language surnames
Khas surnames